Gerry Joseph Quinn (10 September 1917 – 20 November 1968) was an Irish first-class cricketer and rugby union international.

Born at Gort in County Galway, Quinn was educated at Belvedere College in Dublin, before studying law at University College Dublin. Playing club cricket for Phoenix in Dublin, Quinn made a single appearance in first-class cricket for Ireland against the English Minor Counties cricket team in 1937 at Observatory Lane, Dublin. Batting twice in the match, Quinn was dismissed for 12 runs by Henry Butterworth in Ireland's first-innings, while in their second-innings he was dismissed for 2 runs by the same bowler. A member of the Old Belvedere rugby union team, he played twice for Ireland in the 1945–46 Victory International matches, though these matches were not recognised as official capped matches. Outside of sport, Quinn had a successful career as a solicitor. He died while playing tennis with Michael Dargan and Karl Mullen in Dublin in November 1968. Two of his brothers, Frank Quinn and Kevin Quinn, both played cricket for Ireland; additionally, Kevin also played international rugby union for Ireland.

References

External links

1917 births
1968 deaths
Sportspeople from County Galway
People educated at Belvedere College
Alumni of University College Dublin
Irish rugby union players
Old Belvedere R.F.C. players
Irish cricketers
Irish solicitors